The Gamsbart (literally chamois beard, plural Gamsbärte) is a tuft of hair traditionally worn as a decoration on trachten-hats in the alpine regions of Austria and Bavaria.

Originally worn as a hunting trophy and made exclusively from hair from the chamois' lower neck, Gamsbärte are today manufactured on a large scale from various animals' hair and are commonly sold by specialized dealers and also at souvenir shops. 

A Gamsbart is made by enclosing the lower end of the tuft of hair in a setting of metal or horn that allows the upper end to spread in a brush-like fashion. Traditionally, hairs are selected for a dark color at the lower end with a very light tip. The size and diameter of the Gamsbart are important signs of the wearer's pride and manliness.

Traditionally, Gamsbärte are exclusively placed on hats worn by men; however, recent developments in dirndl fashion have seen Gamsbärte added to various places on female dresses.

References
Culturally authentic pictorial lexicon (English) 
About the Gamsbart-Olympia 2008 at BR-Online(German)

Headgear
German clothing
History of clothing (Western fashion)